Forever (also known as Forever: A Ghost of a Love Story) is a 1992 horror-thriller film by Thomas Palmer Jr., at his feature film debut.

Plot

Cast
 
  Sean Young as Mary Miles Minter 
  Keith Coogan as Ted Dickson
  Sally Kirkland as Angelica
  Diane Ladd as Mabel Normand
  Steve Railsback as William Desmond Taylor
  Terence Knox as Wallace Reid
  Gregory Scott Cummins as Rupert Simms
  Iain Sanderson as Alphonse Fettuchini

References

External links
   
 

1990s horror thriller films
American horror thriller films
1992 horror films
1992 films
1990s English-language films
1990s American films